The former Missouri-Pacific Railroad Depot in Camden, Arkansas, is located at the southwest corner of Main and First Streets in the city's business district.  It is a single-story brick building with Mediterranean Revival styling built c. 1917 during a major expansion of the Missouri-Pacific Railroad. ("The Missouri-Pacific Railroad Company incorporated and absorbed the Iron Mountain system, and for many years thereafter "Mo-Pac" was the largest and most important railroad in the state.")

The building was used as both a passenger and freight depot.

The building was listed on the National Register of Historic Places in 1992, at which time it was vacant.

See also
National Register of Historic Places listings in Ouachita County, Arkansas

References

Railway stations on the National Register of Historic Places in Arkansas
Railway stations in the United States opened in 1917
Buildings and structures in Camden, Arkansas
National Register of Historic Places in Ouachita County, Arkansas
Camden
Former railway stations in Arkansas
1917 establishments in Arkansas
Transportation in Ouachita County, Arkansas